Sofia's Last Ambulance (a co-production of Germany, Bulgaria, and Croatia) is a feature-length observational documentary film by Bulgarian director Ilian Metev. The film premiered at the 51st Semaine de la Critique (International Critics' Week) at the 2012 Cannes Film Festival, where it won the inaugural France 4 Visionary Award (France 4 Prix Revelation). It was the second documentary ever to compete in the section's 51-year history.

Synopsis

Sofia's Last Ambulance opens on an ordinary working day of Krassi, Mila and Plamen, the paramedic crew on one of Sofia's dangerously dwindling fleet of emergency ambulances. The medical infra-structure is in ruins and the ambulance services is one of the hardest hit. Soon the daily pressure on the team is revealed in a sequence of absurdities. Unusual for a work about medical services, patients remained tactfully outside of the frame and sensationalism was rigorously avoided. Camera work focused closely on the faces of the ambulance crew to capture changes in their state of mind in their persistent efforts to work despite lack of means, exhaustion and ineffective bureaucracy.

Production
Research for Sofia's Last Ambulance started in 2008. During the research period, Metev met Dr Yordanov, who has been working in the emergency services for 23 years, and was fascinated by his humbleness and industry. Dr Yordanov and his two teammates were responsible for the most critical cases in the capital. The observational documentary was then shot over the period of two years, with the shooting crew consisting of Metev and sound recordist Tom Kirk planted in the back of the ambulance, trying to be as discrete and invisible as possible.
The film was a co-produced in association with German television channel WDR, German/French channel Arte, American equity fund Impact Partners, Bulgarian National Film Center, the Croatian Audiovisual Centre and the German Film und Medienstiftung NRW. Sales agents are Berlin-based Films Boutique.

Cast
Doctor Krassimir Yordanov as himself
Nurse Mila Mikhailova as herself
Driver Plamen Slavkov as himself

Reception
Sofia's Last Ambulance premiered at the 51st International Critics' Week in Cannes. The AFP wrote that "after the screening filmmakers and protagonists were in tears. Number of spectators also." Jay Weissberg of Variety described the film as "rigidly constructed and deeply human" and Julien Gester of Liberation called it a "fine and strong investigation of a state of crisis."

Social impact
At the premiere of the film in Sofia, the Bulgarian health minister Desislava Atanasova admitted that "Sofia's Last Ambulance reflects the reality of things" and pronounced that since the film, two new emergency response units have been opened up in the capital to speed up response times; ambulance crews' wages were to be increased by 18%. Protagonist and emergency doctor Krassimir Yordanov criticized that these reforms were insufficient to address the true cause of the problems: chronically low wages that makes medical professionals leave in droves. Despite 25-years experience in the job, his monthly pay is "less than the weekly pay of any colleague in other European Union countries".

Selected awards

References

External links
 Website
 
 

2012 films
2012 documentary films
Bulgarian documentary films
Documentary films about health care
Films shot in Bulgaria
Culture in Sofia
Healthcare in Bulgaria
Ambulances